Lopate is a village in the municipality of Kumanovo, North Macedonia.

Demographics
As of the 2021 census, Lopate had 2,063 residents with the following ethnic composition:
Albanians 1,597
Macedonians 366
Persons for whom data are taken from administrative sources 70
Serbs 29
Others 1

According to the 2002 census, the village had a total of 2,448 inhabitants. Ethnic groups in the village include:
Albanians 1,886
Macedonians 478
Serbs 80
Others 4

References

External links

Villages in Kumanovo Municipality
Albanian communities in North Macedonia